Niafunke may refer to:

Niafunké Cercle, an administrative subdivision of the Tombouctou Region of Mali
Niafunké, a town in Mali
Niafunké Airport
Niafunké (album), an album by Ali Farka Touré